Khalid Mohammed Sabbar is an Iraqi football defender who played for Iraq in the 1996 Asian Cup. Professionally he played for Al Zawra, Al Shorta, Arbil FC, Kirkuk FC and Al Ramadi.

Khalid Mohammed Sabbar is remembered for scoring the 20-yard winner over Iran at the 1996 Asian Cup in Dubai, U.A.E. The goal scored helped Iraq to a 2-0 lead, came after good build-up play on the left of the Iranian box by Hussam Fawzi and Qahtan Chathir, the ball was eventually laid back for Khalid, who had only come on 20 minutes earlier as a substitute, his powerful shot found the back of the net and the celebrations began, Khalid sank to one knee and wept in delight.

He made his name during the 1996 Olympic qualifiers, where Iraq was only a game away from qualifying for Atlanta Olympics, the team which included goalkeeper Saad Nassir, defender Haidar Mahmoud, midfielder Abbas Obaid and strikers Qahtan Chathir and Hussam Fawzi lost 1-0 to Saudi Arabia in extra-time in a play-off.

Career statistics

International goals
Scores and results list Iraq's goal tally first.

Coaching career 
Sabbar left Al-Kahrabaa FC the in November of the 2018-2019 season, after one win out of 8 games in the league.

Managerial statistics

References

External links
 

1973 births
Living people
Iraqi footballers
Iraq international footballers
1996 AFC Asian Cup players
Al-Zawraa SC players
Erbil SC players
Al-Shorta SC players
Association football defenders